SiteBar is a free online bookmark manager that is available in more than 20 languages. Users can store their bookmarks on a private or public SiteBar server, access them online, and share them with multiple user groups. It features sidebar integration into web browsers and can also import bookmarks from web browsers.

The SiteBar bookmark server is open source software published under the GPL, which enables anybody to run their own SiteBar server and keep their bookmarks under their control.

See also

Social bookmarking
List of social bookmarking sites
List of Firefox extensions
Comparison of browser synchronizers

References

External links
SiteBar.org

Social bookmarking websites
Free software programmed in PHP

Social software